Robert T. Yamate (born 1950 in Monterey Park, California) is an American diplomat of Japanese descent and a career member of the Senior Foreign Service. He previously served as the United States Ambassador to Madagascar and Comoros.

Early life and education
Yamate is from Monterey Park, California. Yamate earned a Bachelor of Science in mathematics at California State Polytechnic University, Pomona in 1973, a Master of Arts in education from the University of La Verne in 1977, and a Master of Business Administration from the University of Pittsburgh in 1983. In addition to English, Yamate speaks French, Japanese, and Hungarian.

Career
Yamate's early Foreign Service assignments included Tokyo, Japan; Budapest, Hungary; and the State Department Operations Center in Washington, D.C.

From 1989 to 1991, Yamate served as the administrative officer at the U.S. embassy in Antananarivo, Madagascar. Following that, he became a management officer at the U.S. consulate in Montreal, Quebec, Canada. In 1994, Yamate was assigned as charge d’affaires at the U.S. embassy in Apia, Samoa.

Yamate returned to Washington, D.C. in 1997 as deputy executive director in the Office of Personnel. He then went on to Taipei as the administrative officer at the American Institute in Taiwan. He returned to Africa in 2002 as a management counselor at the U.S. embassy in Harare, Zimbabwe, and later as minister counselor for management at the U.S. embassy in Abidjan, Cote d'Ivoire.

Yamate was then appointed as minister counselor for management at the United States Mission to the United Nations in Geneva, Switzerland. Yamate returned to Washington, D.C. in 2008 for an assignment in the Bureau of Intelligence and Research. In 2010, Yamate became the deputy chief of mission in Dakar, Senegal, acting as charge d’affaires for a time in 2012. In 2013, he became an assessor on the State Department's Board of Examiners.

Yamate was nominated to be United States Ambassador to Madagascar and Comoros on July 31, 2014. Yamate testified to the Senate Foreign Relations Committee on September 11, 2014, and was confirmed by the United States Senate on November 19, 2014. He presented his credentials in Madagascar on January 14, 2015, and in Comoros on February 3, 2015.

Awards
Yamate is the recipient of two Senior Foreign Service Performance Awards, four Superior Honor Awards, and five Meritorious Honor Awards from the Department of State.

Personal life
Robert Yamate is married to Michiko Yamate.

References

1950 births
Ambassadors of the United States to Madagascar
Ambassadors of the United States to the Comoros
American people of Japanese descent
Living people
People from Monterey Park, California
California State Polytechnic University, Pomona alumni
University of La Verne alumni
University of Pittsburgh alumni
United States Foreign Service personnel
People of the American Institute in Taiwan
21st-century American diplomats